A meter stamp, or meter mark, is the impression made by a postage meter machine that indicates that postage has been paid on a letter or parcel. Meter stamps are widely used by businesses and organisations as they are more efficient than using postage stamps.

Meter stamps are not adhesive postage stamps in the normal sense, although they may be printed on adhesive labels before being applied to mail. Meter stamps are normally in red, although a variety of colours are found.

Components of a meter stamp
The usual components of a meter stamp are:
The country of issue.
The date.
The postal value.
The license number.
The meter manufacturer. (optional)
A slogan relating to the user. (optional)

UPU approval
The international use of meter marks was approved by the Universal Postal Union in 1920, effective 1 January 1922.

Forgeries
Meter stamps can be forged like any other stamp. In the 1990s, fraudsters in Nigeria began to forge meter stamps using a rubber stamp in connection with 419 scams as applying a rubber stamp to letters was much cheaper than even the forged stamps they had previously used.

Revenue stamps

Meter stamps can be used to pay taxes and the resulting meter marks are a form of revenue stamp.

See also 

Indicia (philately)
McInroy Collection A collection of meter stamps in the British Library Philatelic Collections.

References

External links 

 Meter Stamp Society
 International Postage Meter Stamp Catalog

Philatelic terminology